Mesmé is an Afro-Asiatic language of Chad. Zime (Djime) is a generic name.

References

Chadic languages
Languages of Chad